Horwich Parkway is a railway station serving the town of Horwich and suburb of Middlebrook in Greater Manchester, England. The station is close to Junction 6 of the M61 motorway which adds to its convenience as a park and ride railway station. It has digital information displays. 
 
Rail services are operated by Northern Trains. Horwich Parkway opened on 2 July 1999. It is the only railway station owned and managed by TfGM. A ticket office was built in 2007 and car parking provision has been expanded on several occasions. A wind turbine was built in 2012 and the station is powered by green energy. Horwich Parkway is the railway station for the University of Bolton Stadium, home of Bolton Wanderers F.C. and the Middlebrook shopping, leisure and business complex.

On 1st February 2021, management of the station was transferred from Northern Trains to Transport for Greater Manchester.

Facilities 
The station has a ticket office on Platform 1, which is open Monday-Saturday 06:20-19:35. A ticket vending machine is in place for purchase of tickets or promise to pay coupons when the ticket office is closed and for the collection of pre-paid tickets. Digital station information boards are in operation on both platforms. Car parking is available adjacent to the ticket office.

Services

The delayed electrification work on the Manchester to Preston line (running two years behind schedule) led to a temporary reduction in service frequency here from the start of the summer 2018 timetable, along with regular weekend engineering blockades and replacement buses in place of the scheduled train service. Weekend services resumed on Sunday 11 November 2018 after the completion of the engineering work after more than three years of regular weekend possessions.

Electric service commenced on 11 February 2019 utilising Class 319 electric multiple units.

See also
Horwich railway station (town centre station, closed in 1966)

Further reading

References

External links

Horwich
Railway stations in the Metropolitan Borough of Bolton
DfT Category F1 stations
Railway stations opened by Railtrack
Railway stations in Great Britain opened in 1999
Northern franchise railway stations